Embassy Newsweekly, also known as Embassy Newspaper  and Embassy - Diplomacy This Week is a Canadian weekly publication focused on foreign policy and international affairs. The publication reports a readership of over 60,000. It is the Wednesday edition of The Hill Times newspaper.

Embassy Newsweekly was launched by Jim and Anne Marie Creskey in 2004. The latter is also the publisher of both Embassy Newsweekly and The Hill Times.

References

External links
Official website
 About page on official website

2004 establishments in Ontario
English-language newspapers
Newspapers established in 2004
Newspapers published in Ottawa
Weekly newspapers published in Ontario